Charles Marcelo da Silva (born 4 February 1994), sometimes known simply as Charles, is a Brazilian footballer who plays for  Cypriot club Olympiakos Nicosia as a goalkeeper.

Club career
Born in Belo Horizonte, Minas Gerais, Charles Silva joined Cruzeiro's youth setup in 2009. On 22 January 2014 he moved to Vasco da Gama, being assigned to the youth team.

Charles Silva was promoted to the main squad in 2015, and made his Série A debut on 3 June, coming on as a first-half substitute for Julio dos Santos in a 0–3 home loss against Ponte Preta, after starter Jordi was sent off.

In 29 January 2016, Charles Silva signed a four-and-a-half-year-deal with Portuguese club Marítimo after leaving Vasco on a free transfer. He would make 93 appearances for Marítimo across six seasons, including four Europa League starts during the 2017–18 qualifying rounds.

In 1 July 2021, Marítimo would send Charles to another Portuguese club F.C. Vizela. He would start 14 times during the 2021–22 Primeira Liga season, also logging one Taça de Portugal start in the fourth round of the tournament in late November against C.F. Estrela. Charles would lose his starting spot at Vizela in late December of 2021, eventually dropping out of the squad in April of 2022.

In 8 July 2022, Vizela allowed Charles to join Cypriot club Olympiakos Nicosia on a free transfer. On 27 August 2022, he would make his debut in a 1-2 loss to Anorthosis. He was subsequently dropped to the bench for their next two matches, most recently on 12 September against AEL Limassol.

Honours
Vasco
Campeonato Carioca: 2015
Brazil

 South American U-17 Championship: 2011

References

External links

1994 births
Living people
Footballers from Belo Horizonte
Brazilian footballers
Brazil youth international footballers
Association football goalkeepers
Campeonato Brasileiro Série A players
Primeira Liga players
CR Vasco da Gama players
C.S. Marítimo players
F.C. Vizela players
Olympiakos Nicosia players
Brazilian expatriate footballers
Brazilian expatriate sportspeople in Portugal
Expatriate footballers in Portugal